Gemmula martini is a species of sea snail, a marine gastropod mollusk in the family Turridae, the turrids.

Description
The length of the shell varies between 46 mm and 77 mm.

Distribution
This bathyal marine species occurs in the Indo-west Pacific, from East Africa to Borneo and  Timor; also off Western Australia.

Fossils were found in Pliocene strata on Timor.

References

 Tesch, P. 1915. Jungtertiäre und Quartäre Mollusken von Timor. Palaontologie von Timor, Stuttgart 1-70, pls 1-10
 Thiele, J. 1925. Gastropoda der Deutschen Tiefsee-Expedition. Theil 2. Wissenschaftliche Ergebnisse der Deutschen Tiefsee-Expedition auf dem Dampfer "Valdivia" 1898–1899 17(2): 35-382, pls 313-346
 Powell, A. W. B. 1964. The family Turridae in the Indo-Pacific. Indo-Pacific Mollusca 1. (5): 227–346; 1 (7): 409–454. page(s): 257, pl. 196 figs 1-4
 Powell, A.W.B. 1966. The molluscan families Speightiidae and Turridae, an evaluation of the valid taxa, both Recent and fossil, with list of characteristic species. Bulletin of the Auckland Institute and Museum. Auckland, New Zealand 5: 1–184, pls 1–23 
  Wilson, B. (1994) Australian marine shells. Prosobranch gastropods. Vol. 2 Neogastropods. Odyssey Publishing, Kallaroo, Western Australia, 370 pp.

External links
  Tucker, J.K. 2004 Catalog of recent and fossil turrids (Mollusca: Gastropoda). Zootaxa 682:1-1295.

martini
Gastropods described in 1915